Last Testament may refer to:

 Will and testament
 The Last Testament
 Church of the Last Testament